Hilde Gunn Olsen (born 2 March 1992) is a Norwegian footballer, who currently plays as a goalkeeper for Amazon Grimstad.

Personal life
Olsen is from Flekkerøy in Kristiansand.

Career
She first played internationally as an under-15, and continued to feature for Norway through U23 level.

Olsen has played for Amazon Grimstad, AIK Fotboll Dam, Klepp IL, Røa IL and Fløy. Olsen made two appearances for Swedish club Linköpings FC in the 2014–15 UEFA Women's Champions League. In June 2015, Olsen terminated her contract with Arna Biørnar by mutual consent. In July, during the FA Women's League mid-season break, she signed for Sunderland. In September 2017, Olsen transferred to Ayia Napa FC. In 2018, whilst playing for Lyn, she refused to support a gay pride initiative in which players held up posters before a Toppserien match with Vålerenga. She was the only player who refused. In 2019, Olsen signed for Norwegian club Kolbotn. In 2021, Olsen played for Amazon Grimstad, and in August 2021, she played against her sister Karen Andrea Olsen, who was goalkeeper for Gimletroll.

References

External links
 
 

1992 births
Living people
Norwegian women's footballers
Norway women's youth international footballers
Women's Super League players
Sportspeople from Kristiansand
Toppserien players
Klepp IL players
Amazon Grimstad players
Røa IL players
AIK Fotboll (women) players
Linköpings FC players
Arna-Bjørnar players
Sunderland A.F.C. Ladies players
Kolbotn Fotball players
Damallsvenskan players
Expatriate women's footballers in England
Expatriate women's footballers in Sweden
Norwegian expatriate sportspeople in Sweden
Norwegian expatriate sportspeople in England
Expatriate women's footballers in Cyprus
Norwegian expatriate sportspeople in Cyprus
Expatriate women's footballers in Austria
Norwegian expatriate sportspeople in Austria
Norwegian expatriate women's footballers

Association football goalkeepers
Women's association football goalkeepers
Norway international footballers
Expatriate footballers in Cyprus
Expatriate footballers in Austria